Phenomorphan is an opioid analgesic. It is not currently used in medicine, but has similar side-effects to other opiates, which include itching, nausea and respiratory depression.

Phenomorphan is a highly potent drug due to the N-phenethyl group, which boosts affinity to the μ-opioid receptor, and so phenomorphan is around 10x more potent than levorphanol, which is itself 6-8x the potency of morphine. Other analogues where the N-(2-phenylethyl) group has been replaced by other aromatic rings are even more potent, with the N-(2-(2-furyl)ethyl) and the N-(2-(2-thienyl)ethyl) analogues being 60x and 45x stronger than levorphanol, respectively.

See also
 14-Cinnamoyloxycodeinone
 14-Phenylpropoxymetopon
 7-PET
 N-Phenethylnormorphine
 N-Phenethylnordesomorphine
 N-Phenethyl-14-ethoxymetopon
 RAM-378
 Ro4-1539

References

Synthetic opioids
Morphinans
Phenols
Mu-opioid receptor agonists